Herandan (also Romanized as Herāndān and Harāndān) is a village in Haviq Rural District, Haviq District, Talesh County, Gilan Province, Iran. At the 2006 census, its population was 2,576, in 611 families.

References 

Populated places in Talesh County